Thawisan Ladawan (26 January 1924 – 7 April 2006) was husband of Busba Kitiyakara (younger sister of Queen Sirikit), a member of King Bhumibol Adulyadej's Privy Council, and for 26 years, Principal Private Secretary to King Bhumibol Adulyadej.

Education
Thawisan attended Vajiravudh College and graduated from the inaugural class of Faculty of Law, Thammasat University in 1938.

Careers
After graduated, he worked in the Ministry of Foreign Affairs. He worked in several capitals, including Paris and Brussels, and earned a Diplome d'Etudes Superieures de Droit International Public from Paris University in 1954.  He became Deputy Director-General of the Protocol Department before departing in 1968 to serve as Deputy Principal Private Secretary to King Bhumibol. A year later he became King Bhumibol's Principal Private Secretary, and was later appointed to the Privy Council.

Family
Thawisan was the son of Phra Phum Phichai (Mom Ratchawong Bung Ladawan) and Nueang Bunnag. His father was the ruler of Chaiyaphum Province, Lamphun Province, Mae Hong Son Province, and Kamphaeng Phet Province.

Thawisan married Busba Kitiyakara in 1958.  They had a daughter, Suthawan Ladawan Sathirathai on 24 September 1958.  He divorced her soon afterwards and never remarried.  Suthawan married Surakiart Sathirathai.

Died
He died at the age of 82 due to chronic liver disease.

References

 The Nation, Thawisan dies at 83, 10 April 2006
 Handley, Paul M. (2006). The King Never Smiles. Yale University Press, .

1924 births
2006 deaths
Thawisan Ladawan
Thawisan Ladawan